Crystal Peak may refer to:

Geography
Crystal Peak (Alaska) in Alaska
Crystal Peak (Arizona) in Arizona
Crystal Peak (Inyo County, California) in California
Crystal Peak (Lassen County, California) in California
Crystal Peak (Mendocino County, California) in California
Crystal Peak (Santa Clara County, California) in California
Crystal Peak (Sierra County, California) in California
Crystal Peak (Gunnison County, Colorado) (2 peaks by this name) in Colorado
Crystal Peak (Hinsdale County, Colorado) in Colorado
Crystal Peak (Summit County, Colorado) in Colorado
Crystal Peak (Teller County, Colorado) in Colorado
Crystal Peak (Tenmile Range) in Colorado
Crystal Peak (Idaho) in Idaho
Crystal Peak (Montana) in Montana
Crystal Peak (Box Elder County, Utah) in Utah
Crystal Peak (Millard County, Utah) in Utah
Crystal Peak (Olympic Mountains) in Washington
Crystal Peak (Washington) in Washington
Crystal Peak (Wyoming) in Wyoming

Fiction
 Crystal Peak (Terminator), a fallout shelter in the film Terminator 3: Rise of the Machines

See also
 Crystal Palace is sometimes mistakenly called 'Crystal Peak' - see Cheyenne Mountain NORAD base